The 1978 National Challenge Cup was the 65th edition of the USSF's annual open soccer championship. Teams from the North American Soccer League declined to participate.  Maccabee Los Angeles of Los Angeles defeated the Bridgeport Vasco da Gama of Bridgeport, Connecticut in the final game. The score was 2–0.

References

External links
 1978 U.S. Open Cup – TheCup.us

National Challenge Cup
U.S. Open Cup